The Stout ST was a twin-engine torpedo bomber built for the US Navy. It pioneered the American use of metal construction and the cantilever "thick wing" design concepts of German aeronautical engineer Hugo Junkers, themselves pioneered in the second half of 1915.

Development
The US Navy Bureau of Aeronautics had a requirement to review several types of torpedo-carrying aircraft. Prototypes of the Curtiss CT, Stout ST, Fokker FT and Blackburn Swift F were evaluated at the Anacostia Naval Yard.
William Bushnell Stout approached the Navy with his all-metal torpedo bomber design. He estimated the aircraft would cost $50,000 each to produce. The aircraft was built in Detroit, Michigan over a two-year period. Navy officials visited the facility frequently to inspect the new metal-forming and construction methods.

Design
The aircraft was a twin engine conventional geared mid-winged monoplane. Its primary feature was its corrugated metal construction, a new technique and different from the tube-and-fabric airplanes of the time. In addition, the internally supported cantilever wing developed for the Stout Batwing was employed. The aircraft was test flown successfully, however, the airplane showed signs of inadequate longitudinal stability.

Operational history
The first flight of the prototype, designated ST-1, was at Selfridge Field with Edward Stinson at the controls. The flight was witnessed by William A. Moffett, chief of Navy Aeronautics. Stinson suggested changes to the aircraft, but none were made. At an acceptance ceremony, a Marine pilot stalled the aircraft and crashed it. The pilot survived, but all orders for the aircraft were canceled by the Navy.

The loss of the aircraft and the Navy contract were financially devastating for Stout, prompting him to start his famous letter-writing campaign to eventually form Stout Engineering Company.

Variants
ST-1
Prototype, one built.

Specifications Stout ST-1

Notes

References

http://www.aerofiles.com/_stout.html

1920s United States civil utility aircraft
ST
Mid-wing aircraft
Aircraft first flown in 1922
Twin piston-engined tractor aircraft
Twin-tail aircraft